Genetic admixture occurs when previously diverged or isolated genetic lineages mix. Admixture results in the introduction of new genetic lineages into a population.

Examples
Climatic cycles facilitate genetic admixture in cold periods and genetic diversification in warm periods.
Natural flooding can cause genetic admixture within populations of migrating fish species.
Genetic admixture may have an important role for the success of populations that colonise a new area and interbreed with individuals of native populations.

Mapping
Admixture mapping is a method of gene mapping that uses a population of mixed ancestry (an admixed population) to find the genetic loci that contribute to differences in diseases or other phenotypes found between the different ancestral populations. The method is best applied to populations with recent admixture from two populations that were previously genetically isolated. The method attempts to correlate the degree of ancestry near a genetic locus with the phenotype or disease of interest. Genetic markers that differ in frequency between the ancestral populations are needed across the genome.

Admixture mapping is based on the assumption that differences in disease rates or phenotypes are due in part to differences in the frequencies of disease-causing or phenotype-causing genetic variants between populations. In an admixed population, these causal variants occur more frequently on chromosomal segments inherited from one or another ancestral population. The first admixture scans were published in 2005 and since then genetic contributors to a variety of disease and trait differences have been mapped. By 2010, high-density mapping panels had been constructed for African Americans, Latino/Hispanics, and Uyghurs.

See also

 Chloroplast capture
 Gene cluster
 Gene flow
 Haplogroup
 Human genetic variation
 Hybrid
 Hybrid vigor
 Interbreeding between archaic and modern humans
 Introgression
 Population groups in biomedicine

References

Further reading
 
 
 
 Kolbe JJ, Glor RE, Schettino LR, Lara AC, Losos AL, Losos JB (2004) Genetic Variation Increases during Biological Invasion by a Cuban Lizard. Nature 431: 171-181 
 Lenormand T (2002). Gene flow and the limits to natural selection. Trends in Ecology and Evolution. 17:183-189
 Shriner 2013, "Overview of Admixture Mapping"

Applied genetics
Evolutionary biology concepts
Genetic mapping
Population genetics